Gornja Drenova is a village in Croatia. The village has a population of around 300.

References
http://www.citypopulation.de/php/croatia-zagreb.php?cityid=01-4294-022
http://www.alltravels.com/croatia/zagrebacka/gornja-drenova/maps-1260043

Populated places in Zagreb County